Alexander of Constantinople (c. 237/245 – 337) was a bishop of Byzantium and the first Archbishop of Constantinople (the city was renamed during his episcopacy). Scholars consider most of the available information on Alexander to be legendary.

Origin and early life

According to the Synaxarion, Alexander was originally from Calabria in Italy and his parents were called George and Vryaine. From a very young age he was given to God and stayed in a monastery, where he cultivated virtue and became a good labourer of God's commands. He was granted divine visions, while for twenty days he stayed completely fasting. But he also stayed naked for four years and fell into thousands of problems because of attacks of the Saracens. In this way, he lived many years travelling around Greece with his pupils Vitalius and Nicephorus.

Alexander was elected as a vicar to assist the aged bishop Saint Metrophanes of Byzantium. As a result, both Alexander and Metrophanes are reported as the first Bishop of Constantinople (both are also sometimes listed as first "Patriarch" of Constantinople, though the episcopal see had not yet been elevated to that rank). Alexander served as bishop for about 23 years, until his death in 337. At the time of Metrophanes' death, he left instructions in his will to elect his vicar to the throne of Constantinople.

During his episcopacy, Alexander engaged in debate with pagan philosophers and opposed heresies. He was highly praised by Gregory Nazianzus and Epiphanius of Cyprus. Theodoret called him an "apostolic" bishop.

Arian controversy
When the Arian controversy began, Alexander, the Patriarch of Alexandria, requested his cooperation in combatting what he perceived to be heresy. According to most sources, Alexander of Constantinople was present at the First Council of Nicaea as Metrophanes' deputy, although some sources state that Metrophanes (who would have been 117 years of age at the time) attended the council personally. At the council, Arius and his teachings were condemned.

Later, Arius desired to be received back into the communion of the Church. The Roman Emperor Constantine I, having been convinced by the Eusebians, commanded Alexander to formally receive Arius back. According to Socrates Scholasticus, Arius did not in fact repent of his heresy, but was equivocating, and Bishop Alexander was aware of this. Alexander, though threatened by the Eusebians with deposition and banishment, persisted in his refusal to admit Arius back into the Church, and shut himself up in the Church of Hagia Irene (which at that time was the cathedral of Constantinople) in fervent prayer that God would take him from this world rather than be forced to restore someone to communion who he feared was only feigning repentance. As it happened, Arius died on his way to the church, before he could be received back into communion.

Death
Alexander did not long survive Arius. On his deathbed he was said to have nominated his vicar, Paul, as his successor, and to have warned his clergy against Macedonius, who became bishop of Constantinople in 342 and whose teachings inspired Macedonianism.

After his death, Alexander came to be regarded as a saint of the Church. The service in his honor was printed in Venice in 1771. According to some ancient manuscripts, the feast of St Alexander was commemorated on June 2. Today, his feast day is celebrated annually on August 30, in a common commemoration with his fellow Patriarchs of Constantinople John the Faster (582–595, also commemorated on September 2) and Paul the New (780-784).

Notes

References

External links
St Alexander the Patriarch of Constantinople Orthodox Icon and Synaxarion

3rd-century births
337 deaths
3rd-century Romans
4th-century Romans
Roman-era Byzantines
4th-century Byzantine bishops
4th-century Christian saints
People from Calabria
4th-century Archbishops of Constantinople